Jörn Nowak (born April 25, 1986) is a retired German footballer who played as a central defender.

Career
Nowak began his career with Rot-Weiss Erfurt, and made his debut on the opening day of the 2005–06 season in a 4–3 win over 1. FC Köln II as a substitute for Pavel David. He spent three years playing for Erfurt in the Regionalliga Nord, and helped them qualify for the new 3. Liga in 2008, but left the club in January 2009 after making only two brief substitute appearances at this level. He returned to the Regionalliga Nord to sign for Chemnitzer FC, where he spent eighteen months without ever fully establishing himself in the first team. Chemnitz won the division in 2009–10, but Nowak, who hadn't played at all in the second half of the season, left in July 2010 to sign for Sportfreunde Siegen. He spent two years playing for Siegen in the fifth-tier NRW-Liga, helping them qualify for Regionalliga West in his second, before he signed for Rot-Weiß Oberhausen of the same division.

In May 2022, he took over Rot-Weiss Essen as an interim manager and guided them to the 3. Liga.

References

External links

Jörn Nowak at Reviersport

1986 births
Living people
German footballers
FC Rot-Weiß Erfurt players
Chemnitzer FC players
Sportfreunde Siegen players
Rot-Weiß Oberhausen players
3. Liga players
Association football central defenders
German football managers
Rot-Weiss Essen managers